Natalia Yurievna Chumakova married Letova is a Russian musician and journalist best known for being the widow of Egor Letov.

History 
Natalia Yurievna Chumakova was born in 1969 in Kyrgyzstan to Yuri Nikolaevich and Eleonora Illarionovna (nee Khudoshina). The elder Chumakov was a Pushkinist, professor and literary scientist. When Natalia was young, the family moved to Novosibirsk after attempting to settle in Veliky Novgorod. She became interested in rock music after seeing the film Vzlomschik, and played for a short while in Nachalniki Partii, a local band.

She first met Egor Letov at the funeral of his first girlfriend Yanka Dyagileva in 1991, but didn't marry him until 1997, when she joined Grazhdanskaya Oborona as bassist. She provided vocals for the track "Zachem snyatsya sny?", a studio outtake included with the 2011 vinyl reissue of the 2002 album Zvezdopad.

After Letov died in 2008, Chumakova took over his GrOb Records label. She remastered two GrOb albums: Poganaya molodezh and Instruktsiya po vyzhivaniyu and two Kommunizm albums: Soldatsky son and Khronika pikiruyushchego bombardirovshchika in early 2011. All except for IPV were released on the Stanzmarke label on vinyl in 2011. IPV, after resolution of the copyright with Roman Neumoev, was released in 2013.

In 2014, Chumakova released Healthy and Eternal, a documentary about Grazhdanskaya Oborona's early years. She would follow it up in 2018 with The Sunshine Comes Down, a concert film of the group's final concert in Ekaterinburg on 9 February 2008.

References

External links 
 Official GrOb website

1969 births
Living people
Russian women singers
Kyrgyzstani musicians
Musicians from Novosibirsk
Writers from Novosibirsk